The 937th Training Group is a United States Air Force unit stationed at Fort Sam Houston, part of Joint Base San Antonio, Texas.  It conducts medical training for the Air Force.

It was previously active with the 442d Tactical Airlift Wing at Tinker Air Force Base, Oklahoma.  The [[group (military aviation unit) was activated in January 1963 as the 937th Troop Carrier Group when Continental Air Command formed groups to improve the mobilization capability of its dispersed troop carrier squadron (aviation)|squadrons]].  It was inactivated on 20 May 1972 and replaced in the reserves at Tinker by the 507th Tactical Fighter Group when the reserve unit at Tinker converted from airlift to fighter aircraft.

History

Need for reserve troop carrier groups
After May 1959, the reserve flying force consisted of 45 troop carrier squadrons assigned to 15 troop carrier wings.  The squadrons were not all located with their parent wings, but were spread over thirty-five Air Force, Navy and civilian airfields under what was called the Detached Squadron Concept.  The concept offered several advantages.  Communities were more likely to accept the smaller squadrons than the large wings and the location of separate squadrons in smaller population centers would facilitate recruiting and manning.  However, under this concept, all support organizations were located with the wing headquarters.   Although this was not a problem when the entire wing was called to active service, mobilizing a single flying squadron and elements to support it proved difficult.  This weakness was demonstrated in the partial mobilization of reserve units during the Berlin Crisis of 1961.  To resolve this, at the start of 1962, Continental Air Command, (ConAC) determined to reorganize its reserve wings by establishing groups with support elements for each of its troop carrier squadrons.  This reorganization would facilitate mobilization of elements of wings in various combinations when needed.

Activation of the 937th Troop Carrier Group
As a result, the 937th Troop Carrier Group was established at Tinker Air Force Base, Oklahoma on 17 January 1963 as the headquarters for the 305th Troop Carrier Squadron, which had been stationed there since November 1957.  Along with group headquarters, a Combat Support Squadron, Materiel Squadron and a Tactical Infirmary were organized to support the 305th.  The group was equipped with Douglas C-124 Globemaster IIs for Tactical Air Command airlift operations.

The group was one of three C-124 groups assigned to the 442d Troop Carrier Wing in 1963, the others being the 935th and 936th Troop Carrier Groups at Richards-Gebaur Air Force Base, Missouri.

The group flew overseas missions, particularly to the Far East and Southeast Asia during the Vietnam War. In 1972 the group was inactivated as part of the retirement of the Globemaster II, being one of the last USAF units to fly the C-124.  Its place at Tinker was taken by the 507th Tactical Fighter Group. flying Republic F-105 Thunderchiefs, and many members of the 937th transitioned to the new group.

Medical training
In 2011, USAF training activities at Fort Sam Houston were transferred from the 82d Training Wing to the 37th Training Wing.  The group was redesignated the 937th Training Group and replaced the 882d Training Group there.  The 937th Training Group is the only medical training group in the Air Force. It conducts basic and advanced medical courses, and graduates nearly 6,000 students a year.

Lineage
 Established as the 937th Troop Carrier Group, Medium and activated on 28 December 1962 (not organized)
 Organized in the reserve on 17 January 1963
 Redesignated 937th Air Transport Group, Heavy on 1 December 1965
 Redesignated 937th Military Airlift Group on 1 January 1966
 Inactivated on 20 May 1972
 Redesignated 937th Training Group on 31 August 2011
 Activated on 15 September 2011

Assignments
 Continental Air Command, 28 December 1962 (not organized)
 442d Troop Carrier Wing, 17 January 1963
 512th Troop Carrier Wing (later 512th Air Transport Wing, 512th Military Airlift Wing), 5 February 1965 – 21 April 1971 (detached after 1 April 1971)
 442d Military Airlift Wing (later 442d Tactical Airlift Wing), 21 April 1971 – 20 May 1972
 37th Training Wing, 15 September 2011

Components
 305th Troop Carrier Squadron (later 305th Air Transport Squadron, 305th Military Airlift Squadron, 305th Tactical Airlift Squadron), 17 January 1963 – 20 May 1972
 381st Training Squadron, 15 September 2011 – present
 382d Training Squadron, 15 September 2011 – present
 383d Training Squadron, 15 September 2011 – present
 937th Training Support Squadron, 15 September 2011 – present

Stations
 Tinker Air Force Base, Oklahoma, 17 January 1963 – 20 May 1972
 Joint Base San Antonio, 15 September 2011 – present

Aircraft
 Douglas C-124 Globemaster II, 1963-1972

References 
 Notes

 Notes

Bibliography

External links 
 AFHRA Search 937th Tactical Airlift Group

Military units and formations of the United States Air Force Reserves
0937